Rachel Johncock (born 4 October 1993, in Bangor) is a Welsh track and field athlete specialising in the sprinting events. She competed at the 2014 Commonwealth Games, as well as the 2015 European Indoor Championships.

Competition record

1Disqualified in the final

Personal bests
Outdoor
100 metres – 11.45 (+1.7 m/s) (Cardiff 2014)
200 metres – 23.74 (0.0 m/s) (Geneva 2013)
Indoor
60 metres – 7.24 (Birmingham 2015)

References

Power of 10 profile

Living people
1993 births
Sportspeople from Bangor, Gwynedd
Welsh female sprinters
Athletes (track and field) at the 2014 Commonwealth Games
Commonwealth Games competitors for Wales